Hikida's bow-fingered gecko (Cyrtodactylus matsuii), also known commonly as Matsui's bent-toed gecko, is a species of lizard in the family Gekkonidae. The species is endemic to the island of Borneo.

Etymology
The specific name, matsuii, is in honor of Japanese herpetologist Masafumi Matsui.

Geographic range
On Borneo, C. matsui is found in the Malaysian state of Sabah.

Habitat

Description
Dorsally, it has a pattern of irregular dark brown crossbars on a ground color which is yellowish tan. Ventrally, it is uniformly pale gray or pale brown.

Diet
C. matsuii preys on arthropods, especially insects.

Reproduction
C. matsuii is oviparous. However, details of its reproductive habits are unrecorded.

References

Further reading
Hikida, Tsutomu (1990). "Bornean gekkonid lizards of the genus Cyrtodactylus (Lacertilia: Gekkonidae) with descriptions of three new species". Japanese Journal of Herpetology 13 (3): 91-107. (Cyrtodactylus matsuii, new species).
Malkmus, Rudolf; Manthey, Ulrich; Vogel, Gernot; Hoffmann, Peter; Kosuch, Joachim (2002). Amphibians and Reptiles of Mount Kinabalu (North Borneo). Ruggell, Liechtenstein: A.R.G. Ganther Verlag. 424 pp. .
Rösler, Herbert (2000). "Kommentierte Liste der rezent, subrezent und fossil bekannte Geckotaxa (Reptilia: Gekkonomorpha) ". Gekkota 2: 28-153. (Cyrtodactylus matsuii, p. 66). (in German).
Tan, Fiu Lian (1993). Checklist of the Lizards of Sabah, Borneo. Kota Kinabalu, Malaysia: Natural History Publications. 18 pp. 

Cyrtodactylus
Reptiles described in 1990
Taxa named by Tsutomu Hikida